The following is a list of people executed by the U.S. state of Texas between 2010 and 2019. All of the 120 people (117 males and 3 females) during this period were convicted of murder and executed by lethal injection at the Huntsville Unit in Huntsville, Texas.

Executions 2010–2019
The number in the "#" column indicates the nth person executed since 1982 (when Texas resumed the death penalty).  As an example, Kenneth Mosley (the first person executed in Texas during the 2010 decade) was the 448th person executed since resumption of the death penalty.

Notes

References

External links
Death Row Information. Texas Department of Criminal Justice

2010
Executed
People executed in Texas, 2010–19
21st-century executions by Texas
Executed in Texas, 2010–19